Belvoir Priory (pronounced Beaver) was a Benedictine priory near to Belvoir Castle.  Although once described as within Lincolnshire, it is currently located in Leicestershire, near the present Belvoir Lodge.

History

The priory was established in 1076 by Robert de Todeni, Lord of Belvoir, on land near to the castle. Unable to complete the building work due to his "secular employments", following the advice of Lanfranc, Archbishop of Canterbury, he handed the priory to the Abbot of St Albans Abbey. Belvoir priory was then developed as a cell (a small establishment dependent upon a motherhouse) for the abbey. In return for his gift, Robert de Todeni was buried within the priory's chapter house and the monks were to pray for his soul.

The priory was fairly small, housing only four monks. It did, however, attract gifts and patronage; many of those making donations were, similar to its founder, buried within the priory's church or chapter house. Among these gifts were the advowsons of the churches at Redmile, gifted by William d'Albini; and of Woolsthorpe, gifted in 1308 by William de Ros, 1st Baron de Ros.

The priory's small size meant it struggled to support itself and was frequently in debt and facing poverty. As the dissolution approached the priory was no longer in debt but did not have the revenues to support any monks; the prior lived alone, visited intermittently by monks from St Albans Abbey.

Belvoir Priory was dissolved with its motherhouse in 1539, as part of the Dissolution of the monasteries.

Other burials
William d'Aubigny (Brito)
Robert de Todeni
William de Ros, 6th Baron de Ros and his wife Lady Margaret Arundel Roos
John de Ros, 7th Baron de Ros

References

Monasteries in Leicestershire
1076 establishments in England
1539 disestablishments in England
Christian monasteries established in the 11th century
Benedictine monasteries in England
Monasteries dissolved under the English Reformation